The 1910 Australasian Championships was a tennis tournament that took place on outdoor grass courts at the Adelaide Oval, Adelaide, Australia. It was the 6th edition of the Australasian Championships (now known as the Australian Open), the first held in Adelaide and the first Grand Slam tournament of the year.

Finals

Singles

 Rodney Heath defeated  Horace Rice  6–4, 6–3, 6–2

Doubles
 Ashley Campbell /  Horace Rice defeated  Rodney Heath /  James O'Day 6–3, 6–3, 6–2

References

External links
 Australian Open official Website

 
1910 in Australian tennis
1910
March 1910 sports events